Sir Arthur Hugh Ward  (25 March 1906 – 1 November 1993) was a New Zealand accountant, dairy researcher and administrator, company director and university chancellor. He was born in Spalding, Lincolnshire, England, in 1906.

Ward was chancellor of Massey University from 1976 to 1980. In the 1961 New Year Honours, Ward was appointed an Officer of the Order of the British Empire, for services to the dairy industry, and he was promoted to Knight Commander of the same order, for services to the dairy industry and education, in the 1979 Queen's Birthday Honours. He was awarded an honorary DSc by Massey University in 1991.

References

1906 births
1993 deaths
People from Spalding, Lincolnshire
New Zealand accountants
20th-century New Zealand businesspeople
English emigrants to New Zealand
New Zealand Knights Commander of the Order of the British Empire
Chancellors of Massey University